The Peruvian Debate Association (PDA) is a legally ordained, non-profit institution, which organizes and coordinates activities to promote and increase debate in and among schools and universities in Peru. This association was founded in September 2002, by Sixto Ramos, Philosophy, Economics and Peruvian History teacher at Colegio Franklin Delano Roosevelt and representatives from 6 other schools; Santa María Marianistas, San Ignacio de Recalde, Markham College, Casuarinas, Newton and Carmelitas. In 2003 the Peruvian Debate Association along with other non-member schools and colleges helped Colegio Franklin Delano Roosevelt organize the World Schools Debating Championship 2003 in Lima, Peru; the grand final was held at a packed auditorium at Universidad de Lima with well over 1000 people attending.

Every month the members schools for the regular debates at the Beginner, Intermediate and Advanced levels, with students' ages ranging from 11 to 17 years of age. The PDA holds annual try-outs where schools send their best debaters to compete in the selection for the National Team to compete in the World Schools Debating Championship in the so-called "Worlds Style" which is derived from the Parliamentary Debate format.

Starting in 2005, at the request of several members, the Association began having debates in Spanish, it being the national language of Peru, both for the purpose of showing that debate does not only happen in English, but also to broaden the spectrum of possible participating schools from only bi-lingual ones.

Main objectives

 To spread debate among Peruvian schools in both English and Spanish 
 Develop training programs for students coaches and judges
 Support the debate activities organized by member schools
 Organize local, national, and international competitions
 Select the members of the national team who will represent Peru in the World Schools Debating Championship and the Pan-American Competition
 Be open to new school members
 Look for sponsorship for debaters, coaches, and judges to attend international competitions

Benefits for students

Debating allows students to increase and develop their skills in a number of different areas such as: public speaking, logical organization, general knowledge, research, proving a point of view, personal time management, increase in confidence and inter-personal interaction, and teamwork.

Member schools

 Altair School (Peru)
 Abraham Lincoln School
 Casuarinas School
 Franklin D. Roosevelt
 Leonardo Da Vinci School
 Markham College
 Newton College (Peru)
 Peruano Británico
 San Ignacio de Recalde
 San Silvestre
 Colegio Mayor Secundario Presidente del Perú

Peru in the World Schools Debating Championship

Peru sent a team to the WSDC for the first time in 1993 to Medicine Hat, Canada. A brief pause was taken until 1997, then a team was sent to participate in the championship in Bermuda. Ever since Peru has sent a team to compete every year.

Peru's Participation:
 1993- Canada
 1997- Bermuda
 1998- Israel (Semi-finalists)
 1999- England
 2000- USA
 2001- South Africa
 2002- Singapore
 2003- Peru
 2004- Germany (Quarter-finalists)
 2005- Canada
 2006- Wales (Octo-finalists)
 2007- South Korea
 2008- Washington
 2009- Athens (Octo-finalists)
 2010- Qatar
 2011- Scotland
 2012- South Africa
 2013- Turkey  (Octo-finalists, ESL Champions)
 2014- Thailand (Quarter-finalists, ESL Champions)
 2015- Singapore
 2016- Stuttgart (Quarter-finalists)
 2017- Bali (Quarter-finalists, ESL Champions)
2019- Bangkok, Thailiand

All teams coached by Sixto Ramos except for WSDC in Peru 03 and Canada 05. As of 2012, Sixto Ramos is no longer the official coach of the national team as he retired due to personal problems. For the WSDC 2013, the chosen Coach through vote by the PDA is Jorge Gallo, former speaker. For 2014, Luis-Enrique Zela-Koort coached the team and for 2015 the coach was Sebastian Salomón. In 2016, a four-person coaching team was assembled from Peruvian ex-debaters (Jorge Gallo, Sebastían Salomón, Luis Enrique Zela, Sebastián Dasso). The year after in 2017, Luis Enrique Zela and Sebastian Dasso remained as coaches, and took the team to two additional tournaments: (i) The 2017 Harvard Invitational, and (ii) Asian World Schools (AWSDC), the 2017 peruvian team won both tournaments, before WSDC in Bali. Luis Enrique and Sebastian also participated in the WUDC the same year, reaching the ESL finals- the highest achievement any Latin American team has reached so far. 

From 1993 to 2001 all team members were from Colegio Roosevelt, From 2002 to 2018 team members have been from different schools including Markham College, Newton College, San Ignacio de Recalde, Carmelitas and Roosevelt.

The team for 2019 World Schools Debating Championship in Bangkok, Thailand was:

 Juan Diego Albin
 Valeria Leon
 Daniella Leon
 Jean Michel Borit
 Fabio Rahman
 Coaching Team: Marcelo Beramendi and Sebastian Dasso

The team for 2017 World Schools Debating Championship in Stuttgart, Germany was:

 Rafael Shimabukuro
 Lorenzo Pinasco
 Lorenzo de la Puente
 Valeria Wu 
 Leonardo Jimenez
 Coaching Team: Luis Enrique Zela-Koort, Sebastián Dasso

The team for 2016 World Schools Debating Championship in Stuttgart, Germany was:
 Rafael Shimabukuro
 Lorenzo Pinasco
 Lorenzo de la Puente
 Deweena Parija 
 Leonardo Jimenez
 Coaching Team: Jorge Gallo, Luis Enrique Zela-Koort, Sebastián Dasso, Sebastián Salomón.

The team for 2015 World Schools Debating Championship in Pulau Ujong, Singapore was: 
 Rafael Shimabukuro
 Lorenzo Pinasco
 Marcelo Beramendi 
 Lorenzo de la Puente 
Coach: Sebastián Salomón

The team for 2014 World Schools Debating Championship in Bangkok, Thailand was: 
 Jose de los Heros
 Sebastian Dasso 
 Jose Agustin de la Puente
 Rafael Shimabukuro
 Lorenzo Pinasco
 Marcelo Beramendi (Observer)
Coach: Luis Enrique Zela Koort

The team for the 2013 World Schools Debating Championship in Antalya, Turkey was composed by:
 Jose de los Heros 
 Jose Agustin de la Puente 
 Sebastian Salomon  
 Alex Ferrando (Observer)  
 Luis Enrique Zela Koort 
 Maria Jose Villanueva 
Coach: Jorge Gallo

The team for the 2012 World Schools Debating Championship in Cape Town, South Africa was:
 Jose de los Heros 
 Sebastian Salomon 
 Franco Scamarone 
 Luis Enrique Zela Koort 
 Daniela Llirod 
Coaches: Sixto Ramos and Jorge Gallo

The team for the 2011 World Schools Debating Championship in Dundee, Scotland was:
 Jose de los Heros 
 Daniela Llirod 
 Sebastián Salomón 
 Luis Enrique Zela-Koort 
 Daniella Salazar 
 Franco Scamarone (Observer)  
Coach: Sixto Ramos

The team for the 2009 World Schools Debating Championship in Athens, Greece was:
 Arturo Montalván (Colegio Roosevelt)
 Patrick Cooper (Colegio Roosevelt)
 Sebastián Llosa (Colegio Roosevelt)
 Giulia Ciliotta (Newton College)
 Karina Rodríguez (Colegio San Ignacio de Recalde)
Coach: Sixto Ramos

The team for the 2008 World Schools Debating Championship in Washington D.C., United States was:
 Arturo Montalván (Colegio Roosevelt)
 Lucas Ghersi (Colegio Roosevelt)
 Gabriel Pulliati (Markham College)
 Stephanie Guin (Newton College)
 Karina Rodríguez (Colegio San Ignacio de Recalde)
Coach: Sixto Ramos

The team for the 2007World Schools Debating Championship 2007 in Seoul, South Korea is:
 Jorge Gallo (Colegio Roosevelt)
 Gloria María González (Colegio Roosevelt)
 Camilla Korder (Colegio Roosevelt)
 Joaquin Ormeño (Colegio Roosevelt)
 Arianna Plevisani (Colegio Roosevelt)
Coach: Sixto Ramos

The team for the 2006 World Schools Debating Championship 2006 in Cardiff, Wales were:
 Christian Grados (Colegio Roosevelt)
 Gloria María González (Colegio Roosevelt)
 Camilla Korder (Colegio Roosevelt)
 Joaquin Ormeño (Colegio Roosevelt)
 Diego Ortiz de Zevallos (Colegio Roosevelt)

Coach: Sixto Ramos
The team for the 2005 World Schools Debating Championship in Calgary, Canada was:
 Lorena Alarco (Newton College)
 Ruben Del Aguila (Newton College)
 Kyle Hecht (Newton College)
 Juan Diego Farah (Colegio Roosevelt)
 Gloria Maria Gonzalez (Colegio Roosevelt)

Coach: Alejandro Belmont (Colegio Roosevelt)
The team for the 2004 World Schools Debating Championship in Stuttgart, Germany was:
 Nicole Furman (Colegio Roosevelt)
 Kate Gushwa (Newton College)
 Josefa de la Puente (Colegio Roosevelt)
 Jorge Sarmiento (Markham College)

Coach: Sixto Ramos
The team for the 2003 World Schools Debating Championship in Lima, Peru was:
 Nicole Furman (Colegio Roosevelt)
 Jamie McTavish (Colegio Roosevelt)
 Lucia Benavides (Colegio Roosevelt)
 Juan Carlos Canessa (Markham College)
 Katie Gushwa (Newton College)

Coach: Fernando Rodrigo (Colegio Roosevelt)
The 15th World Schools Debating Championships (WSDC) was hosted in Lima by Colegio Roosevelt in August 2003, the only time the prestigious tournament has taken place in Latin America. 2003 was a notable year for Peruvian debate, as it also marked the first change in coaching. After competing in the 2000, 2001, and 2002 championships as a speaker, Fernando Rodrigo returned as a coach. Under the then Harvard freshman's guidance, the 2003 team made a strong showing by winning as many rounds in the competition as the 2002 and 2001 teams combined. Following in Fernando’s footsteps, three of the debaters also made the Top 50 Speakers list that year. Though he was no longer coach, Fernando’s continued influence and contribution became even more apparent when the 2004 team made the Quarter-Finals in Stuttgart. This proved to be a stark contrast to previous years, in which Peru was consistently ranked as one of the lowest scoring countries.

Top 50 Speakers
2001:
Fernando Rodrigo (41)
2002:
Fernando Rodrigo (32)
2003:
Katie Gushwa (39),
Nicole Furman (43),
Jamie McTavish (45),
2004:
No list was made this year
2005:
Kyle Hecht (41)
2013
Sebastian Salomon (16 ESL tab)
Luis Enrique Zela-Koort (48 main tab, 8 ESL tab)
Jose de los Heros (20 main tab, 3 ESL tab)
2014
Lorenzo Pinasco (9 ESL tab)
Jose de los Heros (36 main tab, 5 ESL tab)
Sebastian Dasso (29 main tab, 2 EFL tab)

Peru in the Pan-American Debating Championships

Peru has also had very successful participations at the Pan-American Championships, which was created by Sixto Ramos. The first one was held in Lima, Peru in 2002 where Peru debated at the finals vs. Argentina. In 2004 for the Pan-Americans in Buenos Aires, Argentina two teams were sent:

Team 1:
 Jorge Luis Sarmiento (Markham College)
 Nicolás Aguirre (Markham College)
 Lorena Alarco (Newton College)
 Kyle Hecht (Newton College)
 Alfonso de la Torre (Colegio Santa María)

Team 2:
 Ricardo Maertens (Casuarinas)
 Josefa de la Puente Colegio Roosevelt
 Nicole Furman Colegio Roosevelt
 Gloria Maria Gonzalez Colegio Roosevelt
 Nicolas Vega Colegio Roosevelt

Coach: Douglas Scott

This year (2008) the Peruvian Debate Association hosted the Pan-American Championship in Lima, Peru. Delegations from Canada, Bermuda, USA, and Peru participated in a week of intense debates.

Perú won the championship on 2014 Held at Mexico city. Perú 3, debated in the Spanish division Against delegations from Mexico, Argentina, Champagnat, and Chile. The team won 5 of the 6 preliminary debates to then start the quarter finals. In the quarter finals the decision was unanimous giving the debate to Perú 3-0 against Champagnat. In the semifinals the debate was given by a unanimous decision 5-0 against Mexico. The final debate about austerity was held at the main auditorium on the Tecnológico de Monterrey. 
The Decision was given unanimous to Perú 5-0 against Mexico. 
 
The following team won the tournament:

Marcelo Beramendi (Leonardo Da Vinci)
Rafael Shimabukuro (San Ignacio del Recalde)
Gianluca Venegas (Altair)
Lorenzo Pinasco (Colegio Roosevelt)

The coaches were:

 Jose de los Heros
 Luis Enrique Zela-Koort

A team also participated in the English division of the tournament. This team got to the quarter-final and lost in a tense 2-1 split decision against Canada (who went on to win the championship). The team was composed by:

 Alex Ferrando
 Alejandra Bellatin
 Jose Agustin de la Puente
 Sebastian Dasso

External links
 Asociación Peruana de Debate / Peruvian Debate Association
  Colegio Roosevelt debate homepage
  Sixto Ramos' Formal Debate
  Newton College debate homepage
  Colegio Lincoln Debate: Ganadores por segunda vez

See also
Debate

Educational organisations based in Peru